Another Scandal is a 1924 American silent drama film directed by Edward H. Griffith and distributed by W. W. Hodkinson. Based on a 1923 novel Another Scandal by Cosmo Hamilton, the film stars Lois Wilson and Holmes Herbert.

Plot
As described in a review in a film magazine, Beatrice Vanderdyke (Wilson) is found in the bedroom of a total stranger and, to avoid a scandal, she agrees to marry Pelham Franklin (Herbert). To bring her to a realization of her position, the husband makes her believe he will force her to live up to her part of the marital contract. A year later finds them happy, the wife expecting the birth of a baby. Pel is so nervous that Bee persuades him to go on a cruise on a yacht. May Beamish (le Breton), a pretty grass widow (a divorced woman or former mistress), uses all her wiles to vamp him but fails. Bee is jealous and, after the birth of the baby, she decides to make Pel jealous by going out with a former suitor, Alec Greenwood (Simpson). Pel becomes enraged, decides he is too old for Bee and leaves. On the train he meets May and loans her his New York apartment. Bee determines to fight for Pel’s love and it becomes a battle of wits between the two women. May finally frames a situation where she will have her hired detectives find her in a compromising situation with Pel, but Bee learns of this and cleverly turns the tables. She and Pel become reconciled while May admits failure.

Cast

Preservation
With no copies of Another Scandal located in any film archives, it is a lost film.

See also
Scandal (1917)

References

External links

Thumbnail of lobby poster to the film (archived)
Lobby card (archived)

1924 films
1924 drama films
1924 lost films
Silent American drama films
American silent feature films
American black-and-white films
American films based on plays
Films directed by Edward H. Griffith
Films based on British novels
American sequel films
Films shot in Florida
American independent films
Lost American films
Films distributed by W. W. Hodkinson Corporation
1920s independent films
Lost drama films
1920s American films